The Strong is an interactive, collections-based educational institution in Rochester, New York, United States, devoted to the study and exploration of play. It carries out this mission through six programmatic arms called "Play Partners":
 National Toy Hall of Fame
 World Video Game Hall of Fame
 International Center for the History of Electronic Games
 The Brian Sutton-Smith Library and Archives of Play
 American Journal of Play
 The Woodbury School

It also houses the National Museum of Play.

Independent and not-for-profit, The Strong houses hundreds of thousands of historical materials related to play. These enable a multifaceted array of research, exhibition, and other interpretive activities that serve a diverse audience of adults, families, children, students, teachers, scholars, collectors, and others around the globe.

History
The Strong was founded by Margaret Woodbury Strong in 1968 as the "Margaret Woodbury Strong Museum of Fascination." On her death the next year, the museum inherited her estate and collection of dolls, toys, and other everyday objects. It moved to a new building in downtown Rochester in 1982. Market research in the 1990s led it to pivot toward more family-oriented programming, and in 2002 it acquired the National Toy Hall of Fame, which it renamed the Strong National Museum of Play on 2006.  The institution rebranded itself The Strong in 2010, housing The National Museum of Play and four additional Play Partners.

The Strong collects and preserves artifacts, documents, and other materials that illuminate the meaning and importance of play. The hundreds of thousands of objects in The Strong’s collections comprise the world’s most comprehensive assemblage of toys, games, dolls, electronic games, and other items related to play, many of which are on display in approximately 100,000 square feet (26,200m2) of exhibition space.

Current Exhibits  
 Play Lab
 Skyline Climb 
 Toy Halls of Fame
 Material Girl
 Millennial Madness: The Toys That Shaped a Generation
 Dancing Wings Butterfly Garden
 Women in Games
 Wegmans Super Kids Market
 Reading Adventureland
 Play Pals
 Pinball Playfields
 Peanuts and Play Display
 One History Place
 Imagination Destination
 Game Time!
 Field of Play
 eGameRevolution
 DanceLab
 Elaine Wilson Carousel
 Strong Express Train
 Can You Tell Me How to Get to Sesame Street?
 Build, Drive, Go
 The Berenstain Bears: Down a Sunny Dirt Road
 Aquariums at Rainbow Reef
 American Comic Book Heroes
 America at Play
 Academy of Interactive Arts and Sciences
 Raceway Arcade
 100 Years of Madame Alexander

Former Exhibits
 Kid to Kid
 UnEARTHling
 Between 2 Worlds
 Richard Scarry's Busytown
 Psychology: It's More Than You Think!
 Contraptions A to Z
 Arthur's World
 The Crayola FACTORY presents Journey to the Red Planet
 Pop-Up Culture: Reflections on the Electric Toaster
 Say Aah!
 TimeLab
 Altered States
 Memory and Mourning
 Earth 2U: Exploring Geography
 Kaleidoscope
 Toys from Mars
 Kid Stuff
 The Rochester Business Hall of Fame
 Making Radio Waves
 Geo-Zoooom!
 Face to Face: Dealing with Prejudice and Discrimination
 The Nobel Prize: Celebrating 100 Years of Creativity and Innovation
 Global Shoes
 Not Sold in Stores
 Sweet Shoppe
 Louie's
 Alice's Wonderland: A Most Curious Adventure
 Making Things Happen
 Lady Liberty
 The Berenstain Bears: The Art of Stan and Jan Berenstain
 Adventures with Clifford the Big Red Dog
 Enchanted Museum: Exploring the Science of Art
 Mister Rogers' Neighborhood
 Think Tank
 Discovery Garden
 Things for Play
 Art of the Garden
 Cyberchase
 Bob the Builder: Project: Build It!
 Grossology
 Curious George: Let's Get Curious!
 Make It & Take It
 Name the Newcomer Contest
 Child's Play
 Mr. Potato Head
 Videotopia
 America's Favorite Doll
 Mindbender Mansion
 Toys and More
 National Geographic MAPS
 Five Friends from Japan
 Football: The Exhibit
 Monopoly
 The Wizard of Oz
 Design Zone
 Doodle 4 Google
 Dora & Diego: Let's Explore
 LEGO Travel Adventure
 Boardwalk Arcade
 Atari Design
 Little Builders
 Animation
 LEGO Castle Adventure
 Play Pals
 Trivial Pursuit: A 50-State Adventure
 Cats Versus Dogs
 Joey & Johnny, the Ninjas
 Racers: The Thrill of Driving Game
 Go Greyhound Display
 Sid the Science Kid: The Super-Duper Exhibit
 Playing with Power
 Making Magic
 Perfectly Pez
 Hot Wheels: Race to Win
 Thomas & Friends: Explore the Rails
 Muppets, Fraggles, and Beyond: The Jim Henson Collection
 Rockets, Robots, and Ray Guns
 The Force at Play
 Dinosaurs: The Land of Fire and Ice
 Playing with Politics
 Big, Scary, and Extinct
 Hands-On-Harley-Davidson
 Paw Patrol

Woodbury School 
Woodbury School at The Strong offers a preschool program for three- and four-year-old children and an early kindergarten program for four- and five-year-old children. Both programs are Reggio Emilia-inspired, and therefore responsive to the children's interests. This curriculum approach encourages teachers and students to work together to plan curriculum and create projects. Guided by teachers who facilitate their explorations, children delve deeply into topics that fascinate them and stimulate their learning.

The International Center for the History of Electronic Games

The International Center for the History of Electronic Games collects, studies, and interprets video games, other electronic games, and related materials and the ways in which electronic games are changing how people play, learn, and connect with each other, including across boundaries of geography and culture.

National Toy Hall of Fame

The National Toy Hall of Fame recognizes toys that have demonstrated popularity over multiple generations and thereby gained national significance in the world of play and imagination. Each year it inducts honorees and showcases both new and historic versions of the classic objects of play.

World Video Game Hall of Fame

On June 4, 2015, The Strong opened the doors to its World Video Game Hall of Fame. Its curator is Jon-Paul C. Dyson, who is The Strong's Vice President for Exhibit Research and Development and the Director of the International Center for the History of Electronic Games.

The First Class of the World Video Game Hall of Fame consists of six games: Tetris, Super Mario Bros., Pac-Man, Doom, World of Warcraft and Pong.

The Second Class consists of an additional six games: Space Invaders, Grand Theft Auto III, The Oregon Trail, Sonic the Hedgehog, The Legend of Zelda and The Sims.

The Third Class includes Donkey Kong, Halo: Combat Evolved, Pokémon Red and Green and Street Fighter II.

The Fourth Class includes Final Fantasy VII, John Madden Football, Spacewar! and Tomb Raider.

Games become eligible for the World Video Game Hall of Fame by meeting four basic criteria. They must be iconic, have longevity, reach across international boundaries, and exert influence on the design and development of other games, other forms of entertainment, or popular culture and society.

Brian Sutton-Smith Library and Archives of Play

The Brian Sutton-Smith Library and Archives of Play is a multidisciplinary research repository devoted to the intellectual, social, and cultural history of play. In addition to housing the personal library and papers of eminent play scholar Brian Sutton-Smith, it holds a spectrum of primary and secondary resources, including scholarly works, popular and children’s books, professional journals, other periodicals, trade catalogs, comics, manuscripts, game design materials, personal papers, and business records.

American Journal of Play

The American Journal of Play is a peer-reviewed, interdisciplinary periodical for the discussion of the history, science and culture of play. It includes articles, interviews, and book reviews for a broad readership, including educators, scholars and designers.

References

External links
The Strong National Museum of Play
American Journal of Play
The International Center for the History of Electronic Games
Brian Sutton-Smith Library and Archives of Play
National Toy Hall of Fame 
 Karp, Walter, "A Fascination With The Common Place", American Heritage, August/September 1986 (37:5)

Organizations based in Rochester, New York